Cymbium pachyus, commonly known as the dilated baler volute is a species of sea snail, a marine gastropod mollusk in the family Volutidae, the volutes.

Description

Distribution
This marine species occurs off Cameroun.

References

 Pallary P. (1930). Révision du genre Yetus. Annales du Musée d'Histoire Naturelle de Marseille 22(3): 54-77, pl. 1-2
 Bail, P.; Poppe, G.T. (2001). A conchological iconography: a taxonomic introduction of the recent Volutidae. ConchBooks, Hackenheim. 30 pp, 5 pl.
 Nolf F. (2017). The distribution of species belonging to the genus Cymbium (Mollusca: Gastropoda: Volutidae) in Angolan waters and the description of a new species. Neptunea. 14(3): 1-36

External links
 MNHN, Paris: syntype

Volutidae
Gastropods described in 1930